Monday at 11:01 A.M. is a 2016 American thriller film directed by Harvey Lowry and starring Charles Agron.

Cast
Charles Agron as Michael
Lauren Shaw as Jenny
Lance Henriksen as Bartender
Briana Evigan as Olivia

References

External links
 
 

American thriller films
2010s English-language films
2010s American films